Phạm Văn Sau (born 6 July 1939) is a former Vietnamese cyclist. He competed in the individual road race at the 1964 Summer Olympics.

References

External links
 

1939 births
Living people
Vietnamese male cyclists
Olympic cyclists of Vietnam
Cyclists at the 1964 Summer Olympics
Place of birth missing (living people)